Mark Redhead is a British producer, director, and occasional actor. He was the producer of Bloody Sunday and an executive producer of God on Trial.  He has been nominated for several awards and won a BAFTA TV Award in 2000 for The Murder of Stephen Lawrence.

Biography
Redhead was born in Newcastle upon Tyne. He attended Uppingham School, Rutland, and Newcastle University. He is related to the broadcaster Brian Redhead.

Filmography
Bloody Sunday - Producer
God on Trial - Executive Producer

References

External links
Picture

British male actors
Living people
Year of birth missing (living people)